Multila is the third album by Finnish producer Sasu Ripatti under the name Vladislav Delay.

It compiles the Huone and Ranta EPs Ripatti released on Basic Channel's Chain Reaction label.  It was reissued in 2007 by Ripatti's Huume imprint and again on vinyl in 2020 with a remaster by Rashad Becker.

The album consists of six ambient tracks and the 22-minute techno composition "Huone."

Reception

Multila is one of Ripatti's most highly regarded releases as Vladislav Delay, receiving four and a half stars from Allmusic and being referred to as "the finest album in the hugely impressive Vladislav Delay canon" by Boomkat, though a review of the 2007 reissue by PopMatters said "it never really feels like a complete work."

The experimental psychedelic band Animal Collective praised the album in an article for Spin magazine in 2012.

Track listing
 "Ranta" (4:29)
 "Raamat" (7:16)
 "Huone" (22:04)
 "Viite" (7:41)
 "Karrha" (11:47)
 "Pietola" (16:24)
 "Nesso" (3:11)

References 

2000 albums
Vladislav Delay albums